Spring District/120th station is a future light rail station in Bellevue, Washington, United States. It will be a retained cut station on East Link, a Link light rail line serving Bellevue, in the Spring District neighborhood. It is expected to open along with the section of the line to Overlake in 2024.

Location 
Spring District/120th station will be located between 120th and 124th avenues in the planned Spring District neighborhood of Bellevue.

Design 

The station, designed by LMN Architects, will be built in a trench that places the platforms under street level. To the west of the station, a wye junction will enable access to a planned operations and maintenance facility.

References 

Future Link light rail stations
Link light rail stations in King County, Washington
Buildings and structures in Bellevue, Washington
Railway stations scheduled to open in 2024